Bert Grabsch (born 19 June 1975) is a German former road bicycle racer, who raced as a professional between 1999 and 2013. He was born in Wittenberg and is the younger brother of fellow road racing cyclist Ralf Grabsch. He is a former UCI time trial world champion, having won the title in Varese, Italy on 25 September 2008.

He competed at the 2008 Beijing Olympic Games in the Individual Road Race, which he did not finish, and Individual Time Trial, where he finished thirteenth.  In the same events at the 2012 Summer Olympics, he finished 95th in the road race and 8th in the time trial.

Grabsch retired at the end of the 2013 season, after fifteen years as a professional.

Career achievements

Major results

1998
 1st Stage 4 Regio-Tour
 9th Overall Vuelta Ciclista de Chile
1999
 1st Stage 5 Regio-Tour
 6th Overall Niedersachsen-Rundfahrt
 9th Overall Deutschland Tour
2000
 1st Hel van het Mergelland
 3rd Overall Niedersachsen-Rundfahrt
 3rd Stadsprijs Geraardsbergen
 4th Rund um den Henninger Turm
 5th GP Rudy Dhaenens
 7th Overall Rheinland-Pfalz Rundfahrt
 10th Overall Peace Race
2001
 2nd Rund um Köln
 2nd Giro del Mendrisiotto
 3rd Grand Prix Eddy Merckx
 5th Overall Tour de Wallonie
1st Stage 2
 6th Overall Deutschland Tour
 7th Overall Niedersachsen-Rundfahrt
1st Stage 5
 7th Overall Rheinland-Pfalz Rundfahrt
2002
 1st Stage 1 Vuelta a Burgos
 10th Rund um Köln
2004
 6th LUK Challenge Chrono Bühl
 7th Overall Three Days of De Panne
 7th Grand Prix Pino Cerami
2005
 1st Rund um die Hainleite
 2nd Eindhoven Team Time Trial
 10th HEW Cyclassics
2007
 1st  Time trial, National Road Championships
 1st Stage 8 (ITT) Vuelta a España
 2nd Overall Bayern Rundfahrt
 3rd Sparkassen Giro Bochum
2008
 1st  Time trial, UCI Road World Championships
 1st  Time trial, National Road Championships
 1st  Overall Sachsen-Tour
1st Stage 4
 1st Stage 6 (ITT) Tour of Austria
2009
 1st  Time trial, National Road Championships
 1st Stage 4 (ITT) Critérium du Dauphiné Libéré
2011
 1st  Time trial, National Road Championships
 1st Stage 7 (ITT) Tour of Austria
 5th Overall Three Days of De Panne
2012
 2nd Time trial, National Road Championships

Grand Tour general classification results timeline

References

External links

 
 

1975 births
Living people
German male cyclists
People from Wittenberg
German Vuelta a España stage winners
Cyclists at the 2008 Summer Olympics
Cyclists at the 2012 Summer Olympics
Olympic cyclists of Germany
Cyclists from Saxony-Anhalt
UCI Road World Champions (elite men)
People from Bezirk Halle